Songs for the Deaf is the third studio album by the American rock band Queens of the Stone Age, released on August 27, 2002 by Interscope Records. It features guest musicians including drummer Dave Grohl, and was the last Queens of the Stone Age album to feature bassist Nick Oliveri as a band member. Songs for the Deaf is a loose concept album, taking the listener on a drive through the California desert from Los Angeles to Joshua Tree, tuning into radio stations from towns along the way such as Banning and Chino Hills.

Songs for the Deaf received critical acclaim, and earned the band their first gold certification in the United States. One million copies were sold in Europe, earning a platinum certification from the International Federation of the Phonographic Industry in 2008. Three singles were released: "No One Knows", "Go with the Flow", and "First It Giveth".

Contributors
Songs for the Deaf was the first Queens of the Stone Age album that featured Dave Grohl of Nirvana and Foo Fighters on drums, who also toured with the band. He replaced drummer Gene Trautmann, who started working on other projects. Grohl had admired Queens of the Stone Age since they opened for Foo Fighters, and had wanted to appear on their previous album Rated R. Guitarist Josh Homme, with whom he had been friends since 1992, while Homme was the guitarist for Kyuss, invited him to join in October 2000. Grohl admitted that he had not drummed for a long time and added that fronting a band was "tiring". 

Songs for the Deaf was the last appearance on a Queens of the Stone Age record by Brendon McNichol (lap steel) and Gene Trautmann (drums). It was also the last album to feature bassist and vocalist Nick Oliveri as a full-time member, as he was fired following the tour. The album also included the first musical contribution to a Queens of the Stone Age album by multi-instrumentalists Natasha Shneider and Alain Johannes. Shneider and Johannes, alongside Songs for the Deaf touring recruits Castillo and Troy Van Leeuwen of Failure and A Perfect Circle would subsequently become full-time Queens of the Stone Age members and contribute to the follow-up album Lullabies to Paralyze, released in 2005.

Another change in personnel came with the arrival of producer Eric Valentine, who had previously worked on a pair of Dwarves albums with Oliveri. Valentine was a requirement by Interscope and did not do his job according to Homme, who commented that "[Valentine] just recorded it actually, it says production, he was only there to record the beginning of it". Valentine did sessions with the band from August 2001 through January 2002, despite claiming they were unhappy with his work, the majority of the album recordings are from those sessions.

Rounding out the core recording lineup of Homme, Oliveri, and Grohl, was singer/songwriter Mark Lanegan, formerly of Screaming Trees, a band that Homme had toured with previously. Lanegan joined the band as a full-time member in 2001 after having guested on the band's previous album, Rated R, and provided additional songwriting and lyrics, in addition to lead vocals on several songs.

Production 
Several songs on the album were re-worked forms of tracks previously recorded and released in the Desert Sessions, a side project of Josh Homme with various guest collaborators. "You Think I Ain't Worth a Dollar, But I Feel Like a Millionaire" was the opening track of Volume 5: Poetry for the Masses (Sea Shed Shit Head by the She Sore), with vocals originally performed by Mario Lalli instead of Oliveri. "Hangin' Tree" first appeared on Volume 7: Gypsy Marches. "Song for the Deaf" and "Go with the Flow" were previously performed as early as 2001 with the former having very different lyrics and vocals completely by Mark Lanegan. The main riff for "No One Knows" comes from another Desert Sessions track, "Cold Sore Superstars".

Grohl's drums were recorded in a small, "dead"-sounding isolation booth, to create a "tight, focused, punchy and kind of claustrophobic" sound. To allow for greater flexibility in positioning microphones, the cymbals were recorded separately. To achieve this, Grohl performed each song twice; for the initial pass without cymbals, he hit electronic cymbal pads, then repeated the performance with real cymbals but a dummy snare and padded toms, so only the cymbals made noise. The takes were then blended. Engineer Eric Valentine credited Grohl for his patience in the process, which he described as "very difficult".

Between them, Homme and Oliveri had different opinions on the usage of fake radio excerpts between tracks on the album, the former believing it gave the album "fluidity". According to Oliveri, they are a jibe at "how a lot of stations play the same thing over and over. We don't get played on the radio, so I figure we should talk shit about them."

Artwork 
The cover art for the US double LP version of the album is different from the CD version, featuring a red Q (with a sperm cell as the line in the Q and an egg cell as the circle) on a black background with no other text. It was released on red vinyl. The UK vinyl version cover is the same as the CD cover. The dashboard/interior with superimposed logos is that of a Fiat 124 Sport Spider, a 1960s–1980s mass market Italian sports car. The person on the album disc is musician Dave Catching, who performs on the album.

Both the CD and LP cover have a Parental Advisory seal on most copies, due to the word "fuck" appearing in the tracks "Song for the Dead", "Song for the Deaf" and "Six Shooter", as well as for the violent lyrics of the latter track.

There were also three different album covers that were made for the CD version of Songs for the Deaf. All of the interior artwork for each of the three versions is the same, but there were covers printed in red, magenta, and orange. The most common copy of the album sleeve is the red cover.

Release and promotion 

In September 2002, Homme explained the band's goals with the release of the album:

The album was planned for release on August 13, 2002, but was postponed for two weeks. Grohl put Foo Fighters on hiatus and delayed their upcoming album One by One to October 2002 to tour for Songs For the Deaf. His first performance with the band was at March 7, 2002 at the Troubadour, Los Angeles, and his last was at the Fuji Rock Festival on July 28. He returned to Foo Fighters, with Danzig drummer Joey Castillo announced as his replacement in August 2002.

Reception

Songs for the Deaf was Queens of the Stone Age's breakout album and garnered the band international recognition. Upon its worldwide release in late August 2002, the album peaked at number 17 on the Billboard 200 album chart.

Songs for the Deaf received critical acclaim and is often cited as the band's greatest album to date. On Metacritic, which assigns a rating out of 100 from aggregated critic reviews, Songs for the Deaf is assigned a score of 89, indicating "universal acclaim", making the album the third highest-rated on the site from 2002. Josh Tyrangiel of Entertainment Weekly called it "the year's best hard-rock album", giving it an A. Splendid said "the bottom line is that QOTSA turns in another genre-demolishing, hard-as-titanium album in Songs for the Deaf. This is not your father's metal. It's better." Mojo listed the album as the year's third best. Kludge ranked it at number six on their list of best albums of 2002. NME placed the album as the sixth best, with the three singles each making the magazine's "Tracks of the Year" list over the course of 2002/2003. Kerrang! rated the album at number 1 on its "Best albums of 2002" list.
Music critic Steven Hyden called the album the greatest hard-rock record of the 21st century. In October 2001, while the album was being recorded, Dave Grohl stated that Songs for the Deaf was his favorite album that he had ever played drums on.

The album met with great success earning the band's first gold certification in the US on January 27, 2003, shifting over 500,000 copies, as well as platinum certification in the UK on September 20, 2002, with sales exceeding 100,000 of units sold. and platinum status in Canada. As of June 2007 the total amount of sold copies in the US is estimated at 1,186,000 according to Nielsen Soundscan.

The album received two Best Hard Rock Performance Grammy nominations for singles "No One Knows" (2002), and "Go with the Flow" (2003).

To celebrate the twentieth anniversary of its "Hottest 100" poll, Australian radio station Triple J ran a "Hottest 100 of the last 20 years" poll in June 2013. Songs that were released between 1994 and 2013 were eligible for the poll and "No One Knows" was voted into eleventh position.

Accolades
The information regarding accolades attributed to Songs for the Deaf is adapted from Acclaimed Music.

Track listing
All tracks written by Joshua Homme and Nick Oliveri, except where noted. Lead vocals by Homme, except where noted.

Notes 
 "The Real Song for the Deaf", which is essentially Track 0, is located in the pregap of Track 1 as a hidden track. The hidden track can be found by rewinding the first track to roughly -1:33. A voice comes on and says: "Huh? What?" and a pattern of low-frequency bass plays and modulates for the rest of the song.
 This track, as well as being omitted from some pressings of the album (see track listing), is difficult to listen to on all but conventional CD players. Most software CD players do not allow rewinding of this nature, and most MP3 "ripping" software will not include the data.
 The track was included, unhidden, on the album's cassette tape release, playing before "You Think I Ain't Worth a Dollar, But I Feel Like a Millionaire".
 On most digital distribution platforms, this track is included as part of the entire album. In the US, Spotify and the iTunes Store include it as a separate track. On the UK iTunes Store, it is included as part of "You Think I Ain't Worth a Dollar, But I Feel Like a Millionaire".
 The track is omitted on the 2019 vinyl reissue of the album.
 The intro to track #4, "Song for the Dead", is an homage to Black Flag; the drum rhythm that takes off after the intro solo is lifted directly from the Black Flag song "Slip It In".
 Following a period of silence after the end of track #13, "Song for the Deaf", a short hidden outtake of "Feel Good Hit of the Summer", from the band's previous album Rated R, is played with all vocals replaced with deranged laughter. The song was similarly reprised on Rated R following the track "In the Fade".
 Unlike most edited versions, the edited version of Songs for the Deaf uses loud "bleeps" to censor lyrics, as if it were a live radio broadcast, as opposed to quietly muting the audio track. This sound is used to mask all instances of the words "fuck" and "kill". For the case of "Six Shooter", the lyrics are heard as "[BEEP] this road! And [BEEP] you too! I'll [BEEP]ing [BEEP] your best friend! What you [BEEP]ing going to do!", as opposed to hearing the words "fuck" and "kill".

Personnel
The following people contributed to Songs for the Deaf:

Queens of the Stone Age
 Josh Homme – vocals, guitar
 Nick Oliveri – bass guitar, vocals
 Dave Grohl – drums
 Mark Lanegan – vocals

Additional musicians
 Alain Johannes – lap steel guitar, e-bow, organ, piano, flamenco guitar, theremin (Tracks 3, 6, 7 and 12)
 Natasha Shneider – e-bow, organ, piano, theremin (Tracks 4, 6, 12 and 14)
 Gene Trautmann – drums (Tracks 1 and 8)
 Dean Ween – guitar (Tracks 6, 9 and 14)
 Brendon McNichol – guitar (Track 8)
 Chris Goss – guitar, keyboard, backing vocals (Tracks 5 and 10)
 Paz Lenchantin – strings (Tracks 2 and 14)
 Ana Lenchantin – strings (Tracks 2 and 14)
 Molly McGuire – accordion (Track 14)
 John Gove – horns (Track 14)
 Kevin Porter – horns (Track 14)
 Brad Kintscher – horns (Track 14)

Radio DJs
The songs on Songs for the Deaf are interluded by staged bits of radio chatter with guest DJs. 
In order of appearance:
 Blag Dahlia as DJ "Kip Kasper" of KLON - KLONE Radio of Los Angeles
 Alain Johannes as DJ "Héctor Bonifacio Echeverría Cervantes de la Cruz Arroyo Rojas" 
 Chris Goss as DJ "Elastic Ass" of KRDL - Kurdle 109 of Chino Hills
 C-Minus as DJ for KOOL
 Casey Chaos as station ad promoting "All Death Metal, all the time."
 Jeordie White as DJ Tom Sherman of Banning College Radio
 Lux Interior as DJ for AM580
 Jesse Hughes as Preacher
 Natasha Shneider as DJ for WOMB - The Womb
 Dave Catching as DJ for WANT of Wonder Valley

Technical personnel
 Josh Homme – production
 Eric Valentine – production, recording, mixing
 Chris Goss - recording, assisting production
 Adam Kasper – production ("The Sky Is Fallin'" and "Do It Again"), mixing (at Conway Recording Studios)
 Alain Johannes – recording ("Everybody's Gonna Be Happy", at Sound City Studios, Van Nuys, CA)
 Brian Gardner – mastering (at Bernie Grundman Mastering, Hollywood, CA)
 Dan Druff – guitar technician
 Hutch – sound technician
 Bob Brunner "Mates" – pre-production

Chart positions

Weekly charts

Year-end charts

Singles

Certifications 
Certifications and sales for Songs for the Deaf

References

External links
 

Queens of the Stone Age albums
2002 albums
Interscope Records albums
Ipecac Recordings albums
Albums produced by Josh Homme
Albums produced by Adam Kasper
Albums produced by Eric Valentine
Concept albums